Volleyball was contested for men only at the 1954 Central American and Caribbean Games in Mexico City, Mexico.

References
 

1954 Central American and Caribbean Games
1954
1954 in volleyball
International volleyball competitions hosted by Mexico